Neocoenyra rufilineata is a butterfly in the family Nymphalidae. It is found in Somalia.

References

Satyrini
Butterflies described in 1894
Endemic fauna of Somalia
Butterflies of Africa